Gunnar Åström (1904–1952) was a Finnish international footballer who earned 43 caps at international level between 1923 and 1937, scoring 16 goals.

References

External links
 
 

1904 births
1952 deaths
Finnish footballers
Finland international footballers
Association football forwards
HIFK Fotboll players